The 2020 CONCACAF Men's Olympic Qualifying Championship was the fifteenth and final edition of the CONCACAF Men's Olympic Qualifying, the quadrennial, international, age-restricted football tournament organised by CONCACAF to determine which men's under-23 national teams from the North, Central America and Caribbean region qualify for the Olympic football tournament.

In August 2019, it was announced that the tournament would be hosted in Guadalajara and Zapopan, both cities in the state of Jalisco, Mexico, with the tournament originally scheduled to take place between 20 March and 1 April 2020.

On 13 March 2020, CONCACAF suspended all upcoming competitions scheduled to take place over the next thirty days due to the COVID-19 pandemic in North America. On 14 January 2021, CONCACAF announced that the Men's Olympic Qualifiers would now take place between 18 and 30 March 2021, as the Olympics had been postponed to July 2021.

Host nation, Mexico successfully defended their title after defeating Honduras on penalties in the final. It was their eight Pre-Olympic title and third in a row, after previous wins in 1964, 1972, 1976, 1996, 2004, 2012 and 2015. As the top two teams, Mexico and Honduras both qualified for the 2020 Summer Olympics in Japan as the CONCACAF representatives, just as the same sides had in the previous two Olympics.

On 16 September 2021, CONCACAF announced that the representatives at the 2024 Summer Olympic Games will qualify through the 2022 CONCACAF U-20 Championship.

Qualification

The eight berths were allocated to the three regional zones as follows:
Three teams from the North American Zone (NAFU), i.e., Canada, Mexico and United States, who all qualified automatically due to them being the only teams in the region
Three teams from the Central American Zone (UNCAF)
Two teams from the Caribbean Zone (CFU)

Regional qualification tournaments were held in Central America and Caribbean to determine the five teams joining Canada, Mexico, and the United States at the final tournament.

Qualified teams
The following teams qualified for the final tournament.

Venues
The matches were played in Guadalajara and Zapopan.

Draw
The draw for the tournament took place on 9 January 2020, 19:00 CST (UTC−6), at the Estadio Akron, in Guadalajara, Mexico.

The eight teams were drawn into two groups of four teams. The teams were seeded into four pots for the draw. Pot 1 contained Mexico, seeded in Group A as the host nation, and Honduras, seeded in Group B as the best performing team in the last editions among the other teams. Pot 2 contained the two remaining teams from North America, Canada and United States, Pot 3 contained the two remaining teams from Central America, Costa Rica and El Salvador, while Pot 4 contained the two teams from the Caribbean, Dominican Republic and Haiti.

Squads

Players born on or after 1 January 1997 were eligible to compete in the tournament.

Match officials
The match officials appointed for the 2020 CONCACAF Men's Olympic Qualifying Championship were announced by CONCACAF on 23 February 2021.

Referees

 Juan Gabriel Calderón
 Iván Barton
 Reon Radix
 Mario Escobar
 Said Martínez
 Daneon Parchment
 Fernando Guerrero
 César Ramos
 Jair Marrufo

Assistants referees

 Iroots Appleton
 Juan Carlos Mora
 David Morán
 Gerson López
 Humberto Panjoj
 Walter López
 Nicholas Anderson
 Ojay Duhaney
 Christian Kiabek Espinoza
 Alberto Morin
 Henri Pupiro
 Ronald Bruna
 Frank Anderson

Group stage
The top two teams from each group advanced to the semi-finals.

All times are local, CST (UTC−6).

Group A

Group B

Knockout stage
In the knockout stage, if a match is level at the end of normal playing time, extra time is played (two periods of 15 minutes each) and followed, if necessary, by a penalty shoot-out to determine the winners.

Bracket

Semi-finals
The semi-final winners qualified for the 2020 Summer Olympics.

Final

Statistics

Goalscorers

Awards
The following awards were given at the conclusion of the tournament.

Final ranking
As per statistical convention in football, matches decided in extra time were counted as wins and losses, while matches decided by a penalty shoot-out were counted as draws.

Qualified teams for Summer Olympics
The following two teams from CONCACAF qualified for the 2020 Summer Olympic men's football tournament.

1 Bold indicates champions for that year. Italic indicates hosts for that year.

Broadcasting

Television

Radio

References

External links
Concacaf Men's Olympic Qualifying, CONCACAF.com

 
2020
Olympic Qualifying Championship, Men's
Football at the 2020 Summer Olympics – Men's qualification
2021 in youth association football
2020–21 in Mexican football
International association football competitions hosted by Mexico
Association football events postponed due to the COVID-19 pandemic
Impact of the COVID-19 pandemic on the 2020 Summer Olympics
March 2021 sports events in Mexico